The American Shorthair (ASH) is a breed of domestic cat believed to be descended from European cats brought to North America by early settlers to protect valuable cargo from mice and rats. According to the Cat Fanciers' Association, in 2020, it was the eighth most popular pedigreed cat in the world.

History
When settlers sailed from Europe to North America, they carried cats on board (ships' cats) to protect the stores from mice—for instance, the cats that came over on the Mayflower with the Pilgrims to hunt rats on the ship and in the colony. Many of these cats landed in the New World, interbred, and developed special characteristics to help them cope with their new life and climate. Early in the 20th century, a selective breeding program was established to develop the best qualities of these cats. 

The American Shorthair is a pedigree cat breed, with a strict conformation standard, as set by cat fanciers of the breed and the North American cat fancier associations such as The International Cat Association (TICA) and the Cat Fanciers' Association (CFA). The breed is accepted by all North American cat registries. Originally known as the Domestic Shorthair, the breed was renamed in 1966 to the "American Shorthair" to better represent its "all-American" origins and to differentiate it from other shorthaired breeds. The name "American Shorthair" also reinforces the fact that the breed is a pedigreed breed distinct from the random-bred non-pedigreed domestic short-haired cats in North America, which may nevertheless resemble the ASH. Both the American Shorthair breed and the random-bred cats from which the breed is derived are sometimes called working cats because they were used for controlling rodent populations, on ships and farms. American shorthair (then referred as Domestic shorthair) was among the first five breeds that were considered as registered cat breeds by CFA during 1906.

Description 
Although it is not an extremely athletic cat, the American Shorthair has a large, powerfully-built body. According to the breed standard of the Cat Fanciers' Association, the American Shorthair is a true breed of working cat. They have round faces and short ears.

According to the CFA, American Shorthairs are low-maintenance cats that are generally healthy, easy-going, affectionate with owners and social with strangers. Males are significantly larger than females, weighing eleven to fifteen pounds when fully grown. Mature females weigh six to twelve pounds when they achieve full growth at three to four years of age. With a quality diet and plenty of attention, love, and care, they can live 15 years or longer, requiring annual vaccinations and veterinary checkups. These cats have solidly built, powerful, and muscular bodies with well-developed shoulders, chests, and hindquarters.

The American Shorthair is recognized in more than eighty different colors and patterns ranging from the brown-patched tabby to the blue-eyed white, the shaded silvers, smokes and cameos to the calico van, and many colors in between. Some even come in deep tones of black, brown, or other blends and combinations. Generally, only cats showing evidence of crossbreeding resulting in the colors chocolate, sable, lavender, lilac, or the point-restricted pattern of the Siamese family are disqualified from being shown.

See also
 European Shorthair (or Celtic Shorthair), a similar modern breed derived from landrace European domestic short-haired cats.
Exotic Shorthair
British Shorthair

References

External links 

Cat breeds
Cat breeds originating in the United States
Natural cat breeds